ʿAbd al-Raḥmān ibn ʿAqīl was one of Husayn ibn Ali's companions who was killed in the Battle of Karbala (680), where he is regarded as one of the martyrs. He was a son of Aqil ibn Abi Talib and both a nephew and a son-in-law of the fourth caliph and first Shi'ite Imam Ali ibn Abi Talib.

Lineage 
His father was Aqil ibn Abi Talib, while his mother was a slave woman. Meanwhile Abd al-Rahman was one of Ali's sons-in-law, his wife being Ali's daughter Khadija.

Battle of Karbala 
Abd al-Rahman entered the battlefield at the army of Husayn on the day of Ashura, and recited the following  (epic verses):

"My father is Aqil, (then) you (ought to) know my position; I am from the descendant of Hashim, and Hashim is my brother."

In the Battle of Karbala Abd al-Rahman killed 17 cavalry units from the army of Umar ibn Sa'd, but was eventually killed by Uthman ibn Khalid ibn Rashim.

See also 
Muslim ibn Aqil, another son of Aqil ibn Abi Talib

References

Battle of Karbala
People killed at the Battle of Karbala